Zappa confluentus, the New Guinea slender mudskipper, is a mudskipper endemic to New Guinea, where it is only known from the lower parts of the Fly, Ramu and Bintuni Rivers.  It is found on mudflats adjacent to turbid rivers.  This species can reach a length of  SL.

Etymology
Zappa was named after musician Frank Zappa "for his articulate and sagacious defense of the First Amendment of the U.S. Constitution".

See also
List of organisms named after famous people (born 1900–1949)

References

Mudskippers
Fish of New Guinea
Taxa named by Tyson R. Roberts
Fish described in 1978
Frank Zappa
Oxudercinae
Endemic fauna of New Guinea